Diamante Maria Scarabelli was an Italian soprano singer of the later 17th century and the early 18th century. She is best remembered for having sung the part of Poppea in the premiere of George Frederic Handel's opera Agrippina, a role that requires a wide vocal range, a fairly high tessitura, and a highly developed virtuoso technique. Her great success at Bologna in the 1697 pasticcio Perseo inspired the publication of a volume of eulogistic verse, entitled "La miniera del Diamante".

References
Winton Dean: "Scarabelli, Diamante Maria", Grove Music Online ed L. Macy (Accessed 16 January 2007), grovemusic.com , subscription access.

17th-century Italian singers
18th-century Italian singers
17th-century Italian women
18th-century Italian women
Italian operatic sopranos